Artek may refer to:

Arctic Technology Centre
Artek (camp), an international children center near Hurzuf, Crimea
Artek (company), a Finnish furniture manufacturer